A mental calculator or human calculator is a person with a prodigious ability in some area of mental calculation (such as adding, subtracting, multiplying or dividing large numbers).

The world's best mental calculators are invited every two years to compete for the Mental Calculation World Cup. On July 17, 2022, at Heinz Nixdorf MuseumsForum in Paderborn city of Germany, 12-year-old Indian mental calculator Aaryan Nitin Shukla clinched the title to become the new World Champion. Aaryan ended the dominance of Japanese mental calculators who won the competitions during 2018-Tomohiro Iseda and 2016-Yuki Kimura. Tomohiro Iseda (2018) was the third Japanese person to win the Cup, after Naofumi Ogasawara (2012) and Yuki Kimura (2016). Shakuntala Devi from India has been often mentioned on the Guinness World Records. Neelakantha Bhanu Prakash from India has been often mentioned on the Limca Book of Records for racing past the speed of a calculator in addition. Srilankan-Malaysian performer Yaashwin Sarawanan was the runner-up in 2019 Asia's Got Talent.

In 2005, a group of researchers led by Michael W. O'Boyle, an American psychologist previously working in Australia and now at Texas Tech University, has used MRI scanning of blood flow during mental operation in computational prodigies. These math prodigies have shown increases in blood flow to parts of the brain responsible for mathematical operations during a mental rotation task that are greater than the typical increases.

Mental calculators were in great demand in research centers such as CERN before the advent of modern electronic calculators and computers. See, for instance, Steven B. Smith's 1983 book The Great Mental Calculators, or the 2016 book Hidden Figures and the film adapted from it.

Champion mental calculators

Every two years the world's best mental calculators are invited to participate in The Mental Calculation World Cup, an international competition that attempts to find the world's best mental calculator, and also the best at specific types of mental calculation, such as multiplication or calendar reckoning. The top three final placings from each of the world cups that have been staged to date are shown below.

First Mental Calculation World Cup (Annaberg-Buchholz, 2004)

Second Mental Calculation World Cup (Gießen, 2006)

Third Mental Calculation World Cup (Leipzig, 2008)

Fourth Mental Calculation World Cup (Magdeburg, 2010)

Fifth Mental Calculation World Cup (Gießen, 2012)

Sixth Mental Calculation World Cup (Dresden, 2014)

Seventh Mental Calculation World Cup (Bielefeld, 2016)

Eighth Mental Calculation World Cup (Wolfsburg, 2018)

Ninth Mental Calculation World Cup (Paderborn, 2022) 

The Mind Sports Olympiad has staged an annual world championships since 1998.

MSO mental calculation gold medal winners 

The Mind Sports Organisation recognizes five grandmasters of mental calculation: Robert Fountain (1999), George Lane (2001), Gert Mittring (2005), Chris Bryant (2017) and Wenzel Grüß  (2019), and one international master, Andy Robertshaw (2008). In 2021, Aaryan Nitin Shukla  became the youngest champion ever at an age of just 11 years.

Mental calculators (deceased) 

 Aitken, Alexander Craig (1895–1967), New Zealand mathematician
 Ampère, André-Marie (1775–1836)
 Bidder, George Parker (1806–1878)
 Buxton, Jedediah (1707–1772)
 Colburn, Zerah (1804–1839)
 Dase, Johann Zacharias (1824–1861)
 Devi, Shakuntala (1929–2013)
 Dysart, Willis (1923–2011), a.k.a. Willie the Wizard
 Eberstark, Hans (1929–2001)
 Euler, Leonhard (1707–1783)
 Finkelstein, Salo (born –unknown)
 Fuller, Thomas (1710–1790)
 Gauss, Carl Friedrich (1777–1855), German mathematician and physicist
 Griffith, Arthur F. (1880–1911)
 Hamilton, William Rowan (1805–1865)
 Inaudi, Jacques (1867–1950)
 Klein, Wim (1912–1986), a.k.a. Willem Klein
 McCartney, Daniel (1817–1887)
 Neumann, John von (1903–1957)
 Ramanujan, Srinivasa (1887–1920)
 Riemann, Bernhard (1826–1866)
 Safford, Truman Henry (1836–1901)
 Shelushkov, Igor (born  – ?)
 Wallis, John (1616–1703)

Mental calculators in fiction

Dune

In Frank Herbert's novel Dune, specially trained mental calculators known as Mentats have replaced mechanical computers completely. Several important supporting characters in the novel, namely Piter De Vries and Thufir Hawat, are Mentats. Paul Atreides was originally trained as one without his knowledge. However, these Mentats do not specialize in mathematical calculations, but in total recall of many different kinds of data. For example, Thufir Hawat is able to recite various details of a mining operation, including the number of various pieces of equipment, the people to work them, the profits and costs involved, etc. In the novel he is never depicted as doing actual academic mathematical calculations. Mentats were valued for their capacity as humans to store data, because "thinking machines" are outlawed.

Matilda
In Roald Dahl's novel Matilda, the lead character is portrayed having exceptional computational skills as she computes her father's profit without the need for paper computations. During class (she is a first-year elementary school student), she does large-number multiplication problems in her head almost instantly.

Other
In the 1988 movie Rain Man, Raymond Babbitt, who has savant syndrome, can mentally calculate large numbers, amongst other abilities.

Andrew Jackson "Slipstick" Libby is a calculating prodigy in Robert A. Heinlein's Sci-Fi story Methuselah's Children.

In the USA Network legal drama Suits, the main character, Mike Ross, is asked to multiply considerably large numbers in his head to impress two girls, and subsequently does so.

In Haruki Murakami's novel Hard-Boiled Wonderland and the End of the World, a class of mental calculators known as Calcutecs perform cryptography in a sealed-off portion of their brains, the results of which they are unable to access from their normal waking consciousness.

In the Fox television show Malcolm in the Middle, Malcolm Wilkerson displays astounding feats of automatic mental calculation, which causes him to fear his family will see him as a "freak", and causes his brother to ask, "Is Malcolm a robot?".

In the 1991 movie Little Man Tate, Fred Tate in the audience blurts out the answer during a mental calculation contest.

In the 1990s NBC TV sitcom NewsRadio, reporter/producer Lisa Miller can mentally calculate products, quotients, and square roots effortlessly and almost instantly, on demand.

In the 1997 Sci-Fi thriller Cube, one of the prisoners, Kazan, appears to be mentally disabled, but is revealed later in the film to be an autistic savant who is able to calculate prime factors in his head.

In 1998 Darren Aronofsky's film Pi, Maximillian Cohen is asked a few times by a young child with a calculator to do large multiplications and divisions in his head, which he promptly does, correctly.

In 1998 film Mercury Rising, a 9-year-old autistic savant with prodigious math abilities cracks a top secret government code.

In the 2006 film Stranger than Fiction, the main character, Harold Crick, is able to perform rapid arithmetic at the request of his co-workers.

In the 2007 sitcom The Big Bang Theory, the main character, Sheldon Cooper, calculates numbers and solutions in his head for his theoretical physics research.

In the 2008 show Breaking Bad, the main character, Walter White, is shown to calculate most of the numbers to his deals, such as profit and production costs, purely within his head.

In the 2009 Japanese animated film Summer Wars, the main character, mathematical genius Kenji Koiso, is able to mentally break purely mathematical encryption codes generated by the OZ virtual world's security system. He can also mentally calculate the day of the week a person was born, based on their birthday.

In another Fox television show, Fringe, in the third episode of the third season, Olivia and her fellow Fringe Division members encounter an individual with severe cognitive impairment who has been given experimental nootropics and as a result has become a mathematical genius. The individual is able to calculate hundreds of equations simultaneously, which he leverages to avoid being returned to his original state of cognitive impairment.

In the 2012 film Safe, a female child math genius is kidnapped to be used by the Chinese Triad.

In the 2014 Sci-Fi novel Double Bill by S. Ayoade, Devi Singh, a mental calculator, is one of the 70 lucky children who win a trip to the moon.

In the 2014 TV series Scorpion, Sylvester Dodd, a gifted mathematician and statistician with an IQ of 175; he is described as a "human calculator". 

Shameless Season 7 Episode 1

In the 2016 film The Accountant, a high-functioning autistic tracks insider financial deceptions for numerous criminal organizations.

In the 2017 film Gifted, an intellectually gifted seven-year-old, Mary Adler, becomes the subject of a custody battle between her uncle and grandmother.

In 2020, an eponymous film Shakuntala Devi on the life of Indian mathematician, writer, astrologer and mental calculator Shakuntala Devi.

See also
Child prodigy
Human computer
Hypercalculia
Mental Calculation World Cup
Mnemonist
Genius

References

External links
Mental Calculation World Cup site
Memoriad site
Prodigy Calculators by Viktor Pekelis
Willem Klein
Prodigy Calculators by Viktor Pekelis
Thought and machine processes
Methods and Relevance to Brain efficiency of Neelakantha Bhanu
Tricks and techniques
MSO Results
Lightning Calculators is a three-part essay that discusses these individuals, their methods, and the media coverage of them.

 
Giftedness